is a powered toy car generally 1:32 in scale equipped with 4WD.  The cars can be used for miniature auto racing, being built to race around a U-shaped track.

History
The Mini 4WD originated in Japan in 1982, when toy manufacturer Tamiya introduced Mini 4WD race cars. A Mini 4WD race car is a 1:32 scale kit featuring four-wheel drive powered by an electric motor using a pair of AA batteries. A single electric motor turns both axles. These kits snap and screw together without the need for glue.

By the late 1980s, the Mini 4WD hobby was well-established in Japan, and it began taking off in the United States as well. In February 1989, several American and Japanese companies unveiled their versions at the annual toy fair in New York. In late 1989, an average Japanese boy owned eight to 11 Mini 4WD cars. By November 1989, Hasbro introduced their Record Breakers: World of Speed series of cars, imported from Japan. Mattel, Matchbox, and others were also expected to release their own versions.

By the 2000s, many other companies had ventured into the Mini 4WD market, including Tokyo Marui, Kyosho, Academy, Aoshima Bunka Kyozai, Matchbox, Revell, Hot Wheels, Tonka, Hasbro, Auldey and Bandai.

On June 23, 2019, the Tamiya Mini 4WD Asia Challenge was held at the Glorietta shopping mall in Makati, Philippines. Over 200 participants (including 87 foreigners) attended the event. To commemorate the event, Tamiya released a 1:32 scale mini 4WD car of the distinctive Jeepney named "Dyipne".

World records 
According to the Guinness World Records, the world record for Longest Mini 4WD Track was created on
November 3, 2019 at 3,191.58 meters at Amagi Dome in Izu, Shizuoka, Japan. It took a Mini 4WD car 12 minutes to circle the entire track.

Design
A standard Mini 4WD vehicle is a made of plastic using a Body-on-frame design.  The chassis contains the primary components including the AA batteries, motor, gearing, propeller shaft, drive axles, and wheels.  The body is purely decorative although some newer designs incorporate ducting to cool the motor.  The body and chassis are made from hard plastics like ABS.

Side rollers along the front, center, or rear of the vehicle are used to guide the vehicle around a U-shaped track.

Upgrading
Because of the modular design, nearly all the components can be swapped and change the performance of the vehicle.  This allows the owner to customize the performance of the vehicle to the particular track.

Higher specification motors can be used to replace the standard FA-130 type motor.  There are three specifications that characterize all motors: RPM, torque, and power-consumption. RPM is the speed the motor provides, and the torque its strength. A higher RPM means higher maximum speed, higher torque gives more acceleration and allows the car to better withstand the difficulties of climbing slopes or running through turns.

Gears can also be replaced with sets with different ratios.  Common ratios include  (3.5:1), (3.7:1), (4:1), (4.2:1), (5:1), and "Special" (ratio varies but are usually 6.4:1). The higher the ratio, the better the acceleration rate and torque; the lower the ratio, the better the maximum speed.

In a standard car, the left and right wheels are on a fixed axle.  Special one-way wheels can be added to allowed the left and right wheels to rotate at different speeds acting as a differential, to allow for improved cornering performance.

In addition, upgrade parts such as bumper width extensions, stabilizers, and brakes can be added that aid in the car's performance through corners, banked turns, elevation changes, and jumps.

See also
Dash! Yonkuro - A popular manga/anime based on Mini 4WD
Bakusō Kyōdai Let's & Go!! - A popular manga/anime based on Mini 4WD
Racer Mini Yonku: Japan Cup - A Famicom video game

References

External links

 

Toy cars and trucks
Tamiya Corporation
1980s toys
1990s toys
2000s toys
2010s toys